Rupmati may refer to:

 Roopmati, a medieval Indian queen and poet
 Rupamati, 1934 Nepali novel by Rudra Raj Pande
 Rupavati, rāgam in Carnatic music

Disambiguation pages